Mojanovići (Montenegrin and Serbian: Мојановићи) is a village in the municipality of Podgorica, Montenegro.

Demographics
According to the 2003 census, the village has a population of 1,850 people.

According to the 2011 census, its population was 2,593.

Notable people 
 Žarko Knežević, retired basketball player.
 Dejan Zlatičanin, professional boxer.

References

Populated places in Podgorica Municipality